Ioan Pop (born 24 October 1954) is a retired Romanian sabre fencer. He competed at the 1976, 1980 and 1984 Olympics and won team bronze medals in 1976 and 1984. He won three more team medals at the world championships in 1974–1977.

Pop took up fencing aged 11 and after retiring from competitions worked as a coach with Progresul Bucharest and the national sabre team. In 1990 he was elected deputy secretary general of the Romanian Fencing Federation. In 1994 he left Romania to train the national fencing team of Tunisia, where his students included Henda Zaouali. In 1997 he became the first technical director of the International Fencing Federation (FIR), and in 2013 was inducted into the FIE Hall of Fame.

References

1954 births
Living people
Romanian male fencers
Olympic fencers of Romania
Fencers at the 1976 Summer Olympics
Fencers at the 1980 Summer Olympics
Fencers at the 1984 Summer Olympics
Olympic bronze medalists for Romania
Olympic medalists in fencing
Sportspeople from Cluj-Napoca
Medalists at the 1976 Summer Olympics
Medalists at the 1984 Summer Olympics